Stefan Steen (born January 6, 1993) is a Swedish professional ice hockey goaltender. He is currently playing with the Vienna Capitals of the ICE Hockey League (ICEHL).

He has formerly played with Skellefteå AIK, Växjö Lakers, Färjestad BK and Örebro HK in the Swedish Hockey League (SHL).

References

External links

1993 births
Living people
BIK Karlskoga players
Färjestad BK players
Heilbronner Falken players
Leksands IF players
Örebro HK players
IK Oskarshamn players
Swedish ice hockey goaltenders
Skellefteå AIK players
Vaasan Sport players
Växjö Lakers players
Vienna Capitals players